This is the complete list of Asian Games medalists in jet ski in 2018.

Events

Runabout limited

Runabout 1100 stock

Runabout endurance open

Ski modified

References 

Jet ski
medalists